These are the Top 100 singles of 1974 from Cash Box magazine. A whopping 48 singles reached No. 1 in 1974.

References
http://www.cashboxmagazine.com/archives/70s_files/1974.html

See also
1974 in music
Hot 100 number-one hits of 1974 (USA) by Billboard magazine
RPM number-one hits of 1974 for the #1 hits in Canada

1974 record charts
1974
1974 in American music